Cymbidium suave, commonly known as the snake orchid or grassy boat-lip orchid, is a plant in the orchid family and is endemic to eastern Australia. It is an epiphytic orchid that forms long-lasting clumps of grass-like leaves. Up to fifty crowded olive green to dark or brownish green flowers are borne on an arching flowering stem. Of the three Australian species of Cymbidium, this is the only one that does not have prominent pseudobulbs. It is found in eastern Australia, usually growing in the hollows of old or fallen, decaying trees.

Description
Cymbidium suave is an epiphytic herb that forms clumps of grass-like leaves but lacks prominent pseudobulbs. Flowering occurs between August and January.

Taxonomy and naming
Cymbidium suave was first formally described in 1810 by Robert Brown who published the description in Prodromus Florae Novae Hollandiae et Insulae Van Diemen. The specific epithet (suave) is a Latin word meaning "sweet".

Distribution and habitat
The snake orchid grows in woodland and forest in the hollows of old trees or in fallen, decaying trees. It occurs between Cooktown in Queensland and Bega in New South Wales and as far inland as Tamworth.

References 

suave
Endemic orchids of Australia
Orchids of New South Wales
Orchids of Queensland
Epiphytic orchids
Plants described in 1810
Taxa named by Robert Brown (botanist, born 1773)